Animas may refer to:

Places

United States
 Animas River, Colorado
 Animas, New Mexico, a census-designated place
 Animas Valley, New Mexico
 Animas Creek, an intermittent stream in New Mexico
 Animas Mountains, New Mexico
 Animas Forks, ghost town in Colorado

Mexico
 Animas River (Mexico), a river of Mexico

Other uses
 Animas Corporation, an American medical device maker
 Animas Air Park, a privately owned, public-use airport near Durango, Colorado
 Animation Society of Malaysia (ANIMAS)
 Animas (film), a 2018 Spanish thriller film

See also
 Anima (disambiguation)
 Animas Formation, a geologic formation in Colorado
 Animas Trujano (disambiguation)
 Capilla de Ánimas, Spain, a church
 Las Animas (disambiguation)